The GWR 2021 Class was a class of 140  steam locomotives.  They were built at the Wolverhampton railway works of the Great Western Railway between 1897 and 1905. 1897 was the very year of George Armstrong's retirement, so it is uncertain if the design should be attributed to him or to his superior at Swindon, William Dean.

In fact the 2021s were simple enlargements of the Armstrong-designed 850 class of 1874.  The changes were fundamentally confined to a longer wheelbase to permit fitting of a larger firebox.

History
The class was built in eight batches:
 2021-2030 (Lot D3, 1897)
 2031-2040 (Lot F3, 1897–8)
 2041-2060 (Lot G3, 1898–9)
 2061-2080 (Lot H3, 1899–1900)
 2081-2100 (Lot J3, 1900–01)
 2101-2120 (Lot K3, 1902–3)
 2121-2140 (Lot L3, 1903–4)
 2141-2160 (Lot M3, 1904–5)

Rebuilding with Belpaire fireboxes commenced in the early years of the Churchward era.  Unsuccessful attempts to form a saddle tank around the firebox directly led to the switch to pannier tanks. The rebuilding of the whole class took place over many years. In their final form, with or without fully enclosed cabs, 110 of them survived into British Railways ownership, the last of them being retired in 1959. They were superseded by the short-lived GWR 1600 Class, nominally a Hawksworth design, but in reality a straightforward update of the then 75-year-old design, with new boiler, bigger cab and bunker.

Coachwork
When autotrains were introduced on the GWR, a trial was made of enclosing the engine in coachwork to resemble the coaches. Nos 2120 and 2140 of this class were so equipped in 1906, as were two 517 class 0-4-2Ts. The experiment was unpopular with engine crews, and the bodywork removed in 1911.

See also
 GWR 0-6-0PT – list of classes of GWR 0-6-0 pannier tank, including table of preserved locomotives

References

Sources
 Ian Allan ABC of British Railways Locomotives, 1948 edition, part 1, pp 16,51

 

2021
0-6-0ST locomotives
Railway locomotives introduced in 1897
Standard gauge steam locomotives of Great Britain
Scrapped locomotives